Nebularia pyramis (common name: Pyramis mitre) is a species of sea snail, a marine gastropod mollusc in the family Mitridae, the miters or miter snails.

Description

Distribution
This species is distributed in the Indian Ocean in the Mascarene Basin and in the Indo-West Pacific.

References

 Cernohorsky W. O. (1976). The Mitrinae of the World. Indo-Pacific Mollusca 3(17) page(s): 424
 Drivas, J. & M. Jay (1988). Coquillages de La Réunion et de l'île Maurice

External links
 Gastropods.com : Mitra (Nebularia) pyramis; accessed : 10 December 2010

pyramis
Gastropods described in 1828